Isaac Mordochai Daniel is a Greek-American engineer and professor.

Education 
Daniel attended the National Technical University of Athens in Greece. He received a B.S. in 1957, M.S. in 1959, and Ph.D. in 1964 in Civil Engineering from the Illinois Institute of Technology.

Research and career 
After completing his PhD, Daniel stayed on at IIT managing the ITT Research Institute which he inherited from August J. Durelli and as a professor. In 1982 he moved to Northwestern University where he was the Walter P. Murphy professor and Director of the Center for Intelligent Processing of Composites. He is now professor emeritus with Northwestern. His research encompassed composite materials, nondestructive evaluation, wave propagation, fracture mechanics, and nanotechnology. He was active in the Society for Experimental Stress Analysis and later renamed Society for Experimental Mechanics, being named an Honorary Member of the Society in 2007. He is a member of the European Academy of Sciences. In 2002 a symposium in his honor was held in conjunction with 14th U.S. National Congress of Theoretical and Applied Mechanics and the proceedings published in "Recent Advances in Experimental Mechanics - In Honor of Isaac M. Daniel.”

Awards and recognition 

 Society for Experimental Mechanics Hetényi (1969 & 1975)
 Society for Experimental Mechanics Fellow (1981)
 Society for Experimental Mechanics Lazan (1984)
 SEM Murray Lecture and Award (1998)
 American Society of Mechanical Engineers Fellow (1999)
 Society for Experimental Mechanics Frocht (2006)
 American Institute of Aeronautics and Astronautics Associate Fellow (2006)
 Society for Experimental Mechanics Theocaris (2007)
 Society for Experimental Mechanics Honorary Member (2007)
 American Society for Composites Fellow (2007)
 Society for Experimental Mechanics Taylor (2014)
 Medal of Excellence in Composite Materials (2014)
 American Academy of Mechanics Fellow

References 

1933 births
American engineers
Illinois Institute of Technology alumni
Northwestern University
Fellows of the Society for Experimental Mechanics
Living people